Mohammad Al Khalid Al Sabah (born 1955) is a Kuwaiti politician. He was deputy prime minister twice from 1996 to 2003 and in the period 2013–2017 and interior minister (2013–2016) of Kuwait. He was also the defense minister from 2016 to 2017.

Early life
Sabah was born in 1955. He is the brother of Sabah Al Khalid Al Sabah. His other brother Ahmad Al Khalid Al Sabah is the former deputy prime minister and defense minister.

Career and activities
Sabah was the director general of the General Department of Citizenship and Travel Documents. Then he served as the governor of Hawally from 1991 to 1996.

He was appointed interior minister on 15 October 1996, replacing Ahmad Humoud Al Sabah in the post. Sabah retained his cabinet portfolio in the March 1998 and the February 2001 reshuffles. In 2001 he was also made deputy minister. 

In March 2003, an unknown Islamist group called for the assassination of Mohammad and other senior interior ministry officials, issuing a fatwa. His tenure lasted until 13 July 2003 when Nawaf Al-Ahmad Al-Jaber Al-Sabah was appointed interior minister.

After leaving office Mohammad was named advisor at the diwan of Amir. Then he served as the president of the national security bureau, internal intelligence body, until 2013. He was also special envoy of the Kuwaiti Amir during this period.

He was reappointed interior minister to the cabinet led by Jaber Mubarak Al Sabah on 4 August 2013. Mohammad was also made deputy prime minister. He replaced Ahmad Humoud Al Sabah as interior minister in December. On 10 December 2016, he was appointed deputy prime minister and minister of defense serving the post until 14 December 2017.

In May 2015, he traveled to Washington DC to renew Kuwait's interest in the release of Faiz Mohammed Ahmed Al Kandari, the last Kuwaiti held in Guantanamo.

Personal life
Sabah married twice and has ten children, a son and nine daughters.

References

External links

1955 births
20th-century Kuwaiti people
21st-century Kuwaiti people
Defence ministers of Kuwait
Government ministers of Kuwait
Mohammad
Living people